The 2012–13 Bahrain First Division League is the 56th edition of top level football in Bahrain. Bahrain Riffa Club are the defending champions. The season started on 21 September.

Teams

East Riffa Club and Al Ahli were relegated from the  2011–12 league campaign and replaced by both Al-Shabab and Malkiya who were last in the top flight in the 2010–11 league season of which they both withdrew from.

Stadia and locations

Although most clubs have a stadium, most games are played at the National Stadium. Games are normally played as back to back headers.

League table

Promotion/relegation play-off

Bahraini Premier League seasons
1
Bah